Regional Science High School III (more commonly known as RSHS III) is a science high school located in East Kalayaan, Subic Bay Freeport Zone, Olongapo City, Zambales province of the Philippines. The school implements a specialized science and mathematics-oriented curriculum, mainly for academically strong adolescents and was established in 1994. RSHS III houses a junior high school and a STEM strand focused senior high school. Most of the student body are residents of nearby cities & provinces, majority of whom are from Olongapo City, Bataan and Zambales.

History
Regional Science High Schools were established in the Philippines pursuant to DECS Order No. 69 Series of 1993. The schools were built for above average ability students who have shown an aptitude in science and technology. These specific high schools take Science, Math and English at a higher level. The schools also have an enriched curriculum, undertaking research which is not available in mainstream schools.

The school was originally located at Angeles City High School in Angeles City. but was then relocated to Olongapo City National High School prior to its opening on June 6, 1994. Under the management of then Olongapo City Mayor Katherine H. Gordon and SBMA Chairman Richard J. Gordon, the school was again relocated to the former U.S. Naval Base Subic Bay in Subic Bay Freeport Zone, by present-day Mondriaan Aura College.

Once again, the school was relocated to a former elementary school in East Kalayaan, which is the present location of Regional Science High School III.

The building site was originally built in the late 1950s by the US Navy for their dependent children and was originally called George Dewey Elementary School.  It was renamed Kalayaan Elementary School, run by the DoD schools (Department of Defense).

Environment
Regional Science High School is located in one of the few remaining natural rainforests in the Philippines in Subic Bay Freeport Zone. The school buildings are abundantly surrounded by grass, rocks, shrubs and trees, over the school fence is an off-limits forest.

The buildings currently being used for the school are still the same structures used during its period as an elementary school for U.S. Naval officers' children during the American Regime. Only  few structures in the campus were modified for the better use of the student body.

Exchange Programs
Since 2014, 12 Regional Science High School students have served as International Student Ambassadors and student exchange delegates to Tallwood High School in Virginia Beach, USA, a program of the Olongapo City-Virginia Beach Sister Cities Agreement.

BATCH 1
 Thea Ysobel "Toby" Cortez
 Keana May McCoy
 Via Alexandra Ronquillo
 Janika Mendoza

BATCH 2
 Miguel Ponce Abesamis
 Kyle Timothy Haskell
 Tristan Jed Escalona

BATCH 3
 Aaliyah Shaznay Anilao
 Yvonne Reyes

BATCH 4
 Polyne Gabriel Llanora
 Paulene Miriel Viacrusis
 Edgar Luis Bongco
 Mikee Badilla

Website
http://regionalscience3.webs.com/

The site was created by the RSHS III Supreme Student Government of School Year 2014-2015.

Panorama

References

Science high schools in the Philippines
Regional Science High School Union
Schools in Olongapo
Educational institutions established in 1994
High schools in Zambales
1994 establishments in the Philippines